This article describes the qualifying of the 2019–20 Women's EHF Champions League.

Draw
The four teams played a semifinal and final to determine the last participant for the group stage. Matches were played on 7 and 8 September 2019. In the qualification semi-finals DHK Baník Most took on Rocasa Gran Canaria, while ŽORK Jagodina met Kastamonu GSK. The matches from the tournament was played in one venue. The hosting rights for the qualification tournament were drawn on Wednesday 26 June 2019 in Vienna, Austria. Only the winner of this tournament advanced to the group stage, which starts between 4 and 6 October 2019.

Qualification tournament
DHK Baník Most hosted the tournament.

Bracket

Semifinals

Third place game

Final

References

Qualifying